U.S. Route 60 (US 60) is an east–west United States Highway within Arizona. As it crosses the state, US 60 overlaps at various points: I-17, I-10, SR 77, SR 260, US 191, and US 180. Between Wickenburg and Phoenix, the route is known as Grand Avenue (or the Phoenix–Wickenburg Highway). From Tempe to Apache Junction, it is known as the Superstition Freeway.

Route description

I-10 to Wickenburg
The western terminus of US 60 is located at an interchange with I-10 near the community of Brenda east of Quartzite. It heads northeast from this junction to Vicksburg Junction where it curves towards the east. It continues to the east to Hope where it intersects SR 72. East of Hope, the highway briefly curves towards the north-northeast through the Granite Wash Pass before curving towards the northeast. It continues this direction until it reaches Aguila. The highway heads east to an intersection with SR 71 after passing through Aguila. US 60 continues towards the east until it reaches Wickenburg and an intersection with US 93. From Wickenburg, the highway heads towards the southeast towards Phoenix. It has an intersection with SR 74 in Morristown as it continues towards the southeast.

Grand Avenue

As US 60 enters the Phoenix metropolitan area, It intersects Loop 303 in Surprise where it becomes Grand Avenue as it continues southeast. It continues to a junction with Loop 101 (Agua Fria Freeway) in Peoria before heading through Glendale. The highway enters the Phoenix city limits and continues towards the southeast until it reaches an interchange with 27th Avenue near Thomas Road.

Improvements to the Grand Avenue portion of US 60, which were included in the Maricopa Association of Governments' 20-year Regional Transportation Plan, have been made.  Among such improvements is the reducing of many of the busiest six-legged intersections to four-legged intersections by constructing overpasses, underpasses, and access roads.

I-17/I-10 concurrencies
After briefly heading south along 27th Ave., US 60 turns left onto Thomas Rd. for  until it reaches I-17. At I-17 the highway begins to run concurrently with I-17 towards the south. It passes through an I-10 interchange known as "The Stack." US 60 continues to run concurrent with I-17 around the Durango Curve and continues east until it again reaches I-10 at the interchange known as "The Split." US 60 begins to run concurrently towards the east with I-10 after the interchange. Along the freeway, US 60 passes along the south side of the airport and over a bridge traversing the Salt River. Once over the river, the freeway continues towards Tempe to an interchange with SR 143. The freeway curves back towards the south following the SR 143 interchange.

Superstition Freeway
After the curve, I-10 and US 60 part ways in Tempe, with I-10 continuing towards the south and US 60 now heading east along the Superstition Freeway. The freeway continues towards the east to a second interchange with Loop 101 (Price Freeway). The freeway enters Mesa city limits after the interchange as it continues towards the east to the SuperRedTan interchange with Loop 202. The freeway enters the city limits of Apache Junction in Pinal County as it continues eastbound. The freeway portion of the highway ends in Apache Junction as US 60 curves towards the southeast.

Apache Junction to the state line

The highway continues towards the southeast passing through Gold Canyon to an interchange with SR 79 at Florence Junction. US 60 curves towards the east at this junction as it heads to Superior and an interchange with SR 177. From Superior the highway begins to head towards the northeast to Miami and Claypool. It continues to a junction with SR 188 before passing through Midland City and turning towards the south towards Globe. US 60 curves back towards the east in Globe and continues to an intersection with US 70 and SR 77. US 60 heads northeast from the intersection concurrent with SR 77. The two highways curve towards the north before curving back towards the northeast as they head towards Show Low. As the highway continues towards the northeast it enters the San Carlos Indian Reservation. Within the reservation, the highway goes through a series of hairpin turns as it enters the Salt River Canyon. After descending into the canyon, the highway passes over the Salt River and enters the Fort Apache Indian Reservation. The highway continues towards the northeast and enters Navajo County before reaching an intersection with SR 73. It continues northeast from this intersection to the city of Show Low.

In Show Low, US 60 intersects SR 260 and briefly runs concurrently with SR 260 as it heads northeast through the city. The concurrency with SR 77 also ends in Show Low as SR 77 heads north to Snowflake and US 60 continues towards the east. US 60 leaves the Show Low city limits and heads east to a junction with SR 61 which heads northeast towards Concho. US 60 continues east from this intersection before curving towards the southeast as it heads towards Springerville.

As it enters the Springerville city limits, it intersects and begins to run concurrently with US 180 and US 191. The three highways continue along the same alignment through Springerville, passing over the Little Colorado River. As the three highways continue through the city, they eventually split with US 180 and US 191 heading south towards Alpine and US 60 continuing towards the east. US 60 continues towards the east leaving the Springerville city limits and crossing over the state line into New Mexico.

History

In 1927, what is now US 60 was signed as or roughly followed by SR 74 between the California border near Ehrenburg and Wickenburg, US 89 from Wickenburg to Florence Junction, US 80 from Phoenix to Florence Junction, US 180 from Florence Junction to Globe and US 70 between Springerville and the New Mexico border. The segment of highway between Springerville and Globe had not been constructed yet.
US 60 was extended into Arizona on June 8, 1931, from its original western terminus at US 66 in Springfield, Missouri. While what is now US 60 was under construction between Globe and Springerville, US 60 was temporarily routed down SR 73 as US 60T through San Carlos and McNary. The current route through Show Low was completed sometime between 1935 and 1938. US 60 through Arizona has had far fewer major changes than some other U.S. routes, but one notable example is being replaced by Interstate 10 between Los Angeles, California, and the highway's current terminus near Quartzsite.  (The Arizona section of this route was decommissioned in 1982.)

US 60 is now the only U.S. Route to serve Phoenix. US 70 (decommissioned 1969), US 80 (decommissioned 1977) & US 89 (decommissioned 1992) have all been truncated outside of Phoenix. The only other major change was being realigned from an "in-town" route along city arterials through Mesa, Tempe, and Phoenix to the old SR 360 alignment a few miles south and merging with I-10 and I-17 into Downtown Phoenix.

In 1949, the Pinto Creek Bridge won an Annual Award of Merit for being the "most beautiful steel bridge", given by the American Institute of Steel Construction.

In 1952, the Claypool Tunnel was bypassed by the Queen Creek Tunnel to the north, upgrading from a simple 'hole in the rock' type tunnel to a more modern tunnel.

Recent improvements

In recent years, Arizona Department of Transportation (ADOT) has been working to widen and improve US 60 through the Metropolitan Phoenix Area, as it is one of the area's principal freeways. Along the Superstition Freeway segment in the East Valley between I-10 and Loop 202, ADOT has completed its project of adding additional general purpose lanes (five total plus an HOV lane in each direction), adding auxiliary lanes between exits, improving sound barriers, replacing signs, improving lighting conditions, adding rubberized asphalt to reduce noise, adding variable message signs, installing cameras, and adding traffic sensors. A new partial interchange at Meridian Road, along the Maricopa–Pinal county line, opened in October 2015.

Along the Grand Avenue segment in Phoenix, ADOT has been widening portions of Grand Avenue in addition to constructing additional overpasses and underpasses at six former six-way intersections to improve traffic flow along US 60 in the Northwest Valley.
ADOT is currently in the study phase of adding additional lanes between Loop 101 and Loop 303 in the far West Valley.

Future
Due to rapid growth in the far eastern Phoenix suburbs within Pinal County and increasing road congestion in the Gold Canyon area, ADOT has begun to study potential freeway-grade realignments of US 60 past the current eastern terminus of the Superstition Freeway in Apache Junction.  The new freeway alignment would bypass the existing at-grade section of US 60 through Gold Canyon, and would either rejoin the existing alignment southeast of town (in the vicinity of the Arizona Renaissance Festival grounds) or at the newly constructed freeway-grade junction with SR 79 at Florence Junction.

Major junctions

Notes

Related route

An unsigned U.S. Route 60X is also listed by ADOT is divided into two discontinuous segments, both of which are located within Maricopa County in the Phoenix area. Both sections of US 60X were portions of the pre-freeway alignment of US 60 between Apache Junction and central Phoenix.

US 60X begins near Grand Avenue and Thomas Road at exit 160, where US 60 leaves Grand Avenue for Thomas Road. It then follows Grand Avenue southeast over I-17/US 60, terminating at an intersection with 18th Avenue and Willetta Street.

The eastern segment of US 60X picks up at Sossaman Road, traveling east across Main Street/Apache Trail, crossing Loop 202 and Ellsworth Road before terminating at Meridian Drive, at the Pinal County line.

Major intersections
The eastern segment of US 60X has posted mile markers that likely correspond to the former alignment of US 60.

Western section

Eastern section

See also

SuperRedTan Interchange
Superstition Mountains
Roads and freeways in metropolitan Phoenix

References

External links

060
Transportation in Apache County, Arizona
Transportation in La Paz County, Arizona
Transportation in Maricopa County, Arizona
Transportation in Pinal County, Arizona
Transportation in Navajo County, Arizona
Transportation in Gila County, Arizona
 Arizona
60